Seyfabad may refer to:

Alborz Province
 Golsar, Savojbolagh, a city in Alborz Province, Iran
 Seyfabad-e Bozorg, a former village in Alborz Province, Iran
 Seyfabad-e Khaleseh, a former village in Alborz Province, Iran

Ardabil Province
 Seyfabad, Ardabil, a village in Namin County

Chaharmahal and Bakhtiari Province
Seyfabad, Borujen, a village in Borujen County
Seyfabad, Kuhrang, a village in Kuhrang County
Seyfabad-e Allah Yar, a village in Kuhrang County

Fars Province
Seyfabad, Eqlid, a village in Eqlid County
Seyfabad, Kazerun, a village in Kazerun County
Seyfabad, Khonj, a village in Khonj County
Seyfabad Rural District, in Khonj County
Seyfabad, Sarvestan, a village in Sarvestan County

Hamadan Province
 Seyfabad, Hamadan, a village in Asadabad County

Hormozgan Province
 Seyfabad, Hormozgan, a village in Hajjiabad County

Isfahan Province
Seyfabad, Kashan, a village in Kashan County
Seyfabad, Isfahan, a village in Nain County

Kerman Province
 Seyfabad, Jiroft, a village in Jiroft County
 Seyfabad-e Muqufeh, a village in Jiroft County
 Seyfabad, Narmashir, a village in Narmashir County

Khuzestan Province
 Seyfabad, Dezful, a village in Dezful County
 Seyfabad, Masjed Soleyman, a village in Masjed Soleyman County

Kurdistan Province
 Seyfabad, Bijar, a village in Bijar County
 Seyfabad, Kamyaran, a village in Kamyaran County
 Seyfabad, Saqqez, a village in Saqqez County

Lorestan Province
 Seyfabad, Khorramabad, a village in Khorramabad County
 Seyfabad, Selseleh, a village in Selseleh County

Markazi Province
 Seyfabad, Markazi, a village in Saveh County

Qazvin Province
 Seyfabad, Qazvin, a village in Takestan County

Qom Province
 Seyfabad, Qom, a village in Qom Province, Iran

Razavi Khorasan Province
 Seyfabad, Bardaskan, a village in Bardaskan County
 Seyfabad, Nishapur, a village in Nishapur County

Yazd Province
 Seyfabad, Yazd, a village in Khatam County

Zanjan Province
 Seyfabad, Zanjan, a village in Zanjan County